Turkowice  is a village in the administrative district of Gmina Werbkowice, within Hrubieszów County, Lublin Voivodeship, in eastern Poland.

History

World War II
During the World War II, in March 1944, Turkowice was attacked by Polish partisans in reprisal for the Massacres of Poles in Volhynia carried out by Ukrainian nationalists. Eighty Ukrainian villagers were murdered and 150 houses destroyed.

References

Turkowice
Massacres of Ukrainians during World War II